Hammond is a village in St. Croix County, Wisconsin, United States. The population was 1,922 at the 2010 census. The village is located within the Town of Hammond. Hammond was home to the Running of the Llamas.

History
Hammond was named in 1856 for R. B. Hammond, an original owner of the town site. A post office called Hammond has been in operation since 1858.

Geography
Hammond is located at  (44.975598, -92.435452).

Demographics

2010 census
As of the census of 2010, there were 1,922 people, 715 households, and 499 families living in the village. The racial makeup of the village was 96.0% White, 0.5% African American, 0.4% Native American, 0.7% Asian, 0.1% Pacific Islander, 0.6% from other races, and 1.8% from two or more races. Hispanic or Latino of any race were 2.9% of the population.

There were 715 households, of which 40.7% had children under the age of 18 living with them, 54.8% were married couples living together, 9.2% had a female householder with no husband present, 5.7% had a male householder with no wife present, and 30.2% were non-families. 23.9% of all households were made up of individuals, and 7.4% had someone living alone who was 65 years of age or older. The average household size was 2.62 and the average family size was 3.08.

The median age in the village was 33.1 years. 29.3% of residents were under the age of 18; 6.7% were between the ages of 18 and 24; 32.7% were from 25 to 44; 22.3% were from 45 to 64; and 9.1% were 65 years of age or older. The gender makeup of the village was 49.7% male and 50.3% female.

2000 census
As of the census of 2000, there were 1,153 people, 433 households, and 313 families living in the village. The racial makeup of the village was 98.79% White, 0.09% Black or African American, 0.17% Asian, and 0.95% from two or more races. 0.26% of the population were Hispanic or Latino of any race.

There were 433 households, out of which 39.7% had children under the age of 18 living with them, 56.4% were married couples living together, 11.8% had a female householder with no husband present, and 27.7% were non-families. 20.6% of all households were made up of individuals, and 7.6% had someone living alone who was 65 years of age or older. The average household size was 2.55 and the average family size was 2.95.

In the village, the population was spread out, with 26.5% under the age of 18, 9.5% from 18 to 24, 32.1% from 25 to 44, 18.3% from 45 to 64, and 13.5% who were 65 years of age or older. The median age was 34 years. For every 100 females, there were 88.4 males. For every 100 females age 18 and over, there were 88.6 males.

The median income for a household in the village was $45,789, and the median income for a family was $54,722. Males had a median income of $37,337 versus $27,031 for females. The per capita income for the village was $19,002. About 2.5% of families and 3.5% of the population were below the poverty line, including 3.1% of those under age 18 and 4.6% of those age 65 or over.

References

External links
 Village of Hammond, Wisconsin
 St Croix Central School District
 Sanborn fire insurance maps: 1895 1902

Villages in St. Croix County, Wisconsin
Villages in Wisconsin